3 Idiots is an Indian Hindi-language coming-of-age comedy-drama film co-written (with Abhijat Joshi) and directed by Rajkumar Hirani. The film is based on novel Five Point Someone by Chetan Bhagat, it follows the friendship of three students at an Indian engineering college and is a satire about the social pressures under an Indian education system. The film stars Aamir Khan, Madhavan, Sharman Joshi, Kareena Kapoor Khan, Boman Irani and Omi Vaidya in lead roles. 3 Idiots has been remade in Tamil entitled Nanban (2012) and Spanish-language Mexican remake named 3 idiotas (2017).

3 Idiots garnered awards and nominations in a variety of categories with particular praise for its direction, screenplay, the cast's performances, cinematography, and musical score. Rotten Tomatoes, a review aggregator, surveyed 13 reviews and judged 100% to be positive, with an average rating of 7.44/10. At the 55th Filmfare Awards, the film received eleven nominations including Best Film, Best Director for Hirani, and went on to win six awards: Best Film, Best Director, Best Dialogue, Best Screenplay, and Best Supporting Actor. At the 11th IIFA Awards, the film garnered twenty-three nominations and went on to win seventeen awards: Best Film, Best Director and Best Editing for Hirani, Best Performance in a Leading Role (Female) for Kareena Kapoor, Best Performance in a Supporting Role (Male) for Sharman Joshi, Best Performance in a Negative Role for Boman Irani, Best Male Debut for Omi Vaidya.

3 Idiots won the National Film Award for Best Popular Film Providing Wholesome Entertainment, the National Film Award for Best Lyrics, and the National Film Award for Best Audiography at the 57th National Film Awards. At the 37th Japan Academy Film Prize, the film was nominated for the Outstanding Foreign Language Film. At the 1st Global Indian Music Academy Awards, 3 Idiots won the GiMA Award for Best Engineer – Theatre Mix, GiMA Award for Best Music Debut, GiMA Award for Best Male Playback Singer, and the GiMA Award for Best Lyricist.

Accolades

References

External links
 

Lists of accolades by Indian film